Kuldeep Singh Rathore is an Indian politician from the Indian National Congress. He is a member of the 14th Himachal Pradesh Legislative Assembly, representing Theog-Kumarsain Assembly constituency of Himachal Pradesh.

He was the president of the Himachal Pradesh Congress Committee from 2019 to 2022.

He was appointed National Spokesperson of All India Congress Committee in 2022.

References

Indian National Congress politicians from Himachal Pradesh
Members of the Himachal Pradesh Legislative Assembly
Year of birth missing (living people)
Living people